Eugenio Massi (13 August 1875 – 10 December 1944) was an Italian Catholic missionary prelate and archbishop of the Roman Catholic Archdiocese of Taiyuan from 1910 to 1916 and apostolic administrator of the Roman Catholic Archdiocese of Hankou from 1927 to 1944.

Biography
Eugenio Massi was born in Monteprandone, Province of Ascoli Piceno, Kingdom of Italy, on 13 August 1875. He was ordained a priest on 20 February 1898. That same year, he was sent to preach in Shanxi, China. On 15 February 1910, he was appointed archbishop of the Roman Catholic Archdiocese of Taiyuan by Pope Pius X, and was transferred to the Roman Catholic Archdiocese of Hankou in 1925.

In December 1944, the United States Army Air Forces carried out a strategic bombing of Hankou controlled by the Wang Jingwei regime.

References

1875 births
1944 deaths
People from Ascoli Piceno
Italian Roman Catholic missionaries
Italian Roman Catholic bishops
Chinese Roman Catholic bishops